Semih Şentürk (born 29 April 1983) is a Turkish former international footballer who played as a striker.

He has spent most of his club career at Fenerbahçe where he played between 1999 and 2014, winning 5 Süper Lig and 2 Turkish Cup titles, having risen through the ranks of the Fenerbahçe youth section. Şentürk was a part of Turkey at UEFA Euro 2008, in which Turkey reaches semi-finals. Şentürk was the top-scorer of Süper Lig in 2007–08 season with 17 goals.

Club career

Şentürk started his career at Özçamdibispor, a local club in İzmir in 1993. He joined Fenerbahçe in 1999. Şentürk cemented his place in the team during 2007–08 season, in which he scored 17 goals and finished the season as Süper Lig's top scorer. His more prominent role in the team was rewarded after he was named as the vice-captain of the team in 2007 after the departure of the former captains Ümit Özat and Tuncay. His four goals against MTK Budapest on 6 August 2008 meant that Semih became only the second Turkish player after Fethi Heper to score four goals in a single European match. In 2008, he signed his first extension contract keeping him at the club until May 2010. In 2011, he signed another contract extension which will keep him at the club until 2014.

On 19 June 2013 Şentürk left Fenerbahçe. On 26 January 2014, Semih scored his first goal for his new team Antalyaspor. Later on, he played for İstanbul Başakşehir and Eskişehirspor.

International career

Şentürk was included to Turkey by Fatih Terim. On 11 June he came on as a substitute in the 46th minute and in the 57th minute of the second Group A encounter against Switzerland and scored the equalizer with a powerful header outjumping Swiss defence and beating the goalkeeper, even though he got a hand on it. In the quarter-finals match versus Croatia, Şentürk scored a last-second equalizer, leading team to beat Croatia through the penalty shootouts.

In Euro 2008 semi-final against Germany turned out to have a thriller ending in which Şentürk played a key role. In the 86th minute, just 7 minutes after Miroslav Klose's goal, Şentürk took a low cross provided by teammate Sabri Sarıoğlu and steered in the crucial equalizer. However, his side went on to be defeated as Germany's winger-back Philipp Lahm managed to score a decisive goal in the 90th minute, which knocked out Turkey eventually. Upon the end of the competition, Şentürk received many plaudits for his last minute heroics, with the press labeling him as the super-sub of the tournament.

Career statistics

Player
Source:

International
Source:

International goals

Honours

Fenerbahçe
Süper Lig: 2000–01, 2003–04, 2004–05, 2006–07, 2010–11
Türkiye Kupası: 2011–12, 2012–13
Süper Kupa: 2007, 2009

Turkey
 UEFA European Championship bronze medalist: 2008

Individual
Süper Lig Top Scorer (17 goals): 2007–08

Notes

References

External links

1983 births
Living people
Footballers from İzmir
Turkish footballers
Turkey international footballers
Turkey under-21 international footballers
Turkey youth international footballers
Süper Lig players
Fenerbahçe S.K. footballers
İzmirspor footballers
Antalyaspor footballers
Eskişehirspor footballers
İstanbul Başakşehir F.K. players
UEFA Euro 2008 players
Association football forwards